China Motor Corporation (CMC) is an automobile manufacturer based in Taipei, Taiwan.

History
It was founded in June 1969, and signed a technology sharing contract with Mitsubishi Motors the following year. On 12 December 1973 they opened their first manufacturing facility, in Yangmei. Initially vehicle production was at a rate of 300 vehicles per month, but thanks to rapid growth, and the development of an advanced painting facility, the factory produced its 100,000th vehicle in 1983.

Originally they only produced commercial vehicles, but have since expanded operations, producing more than 100,000 vehicles per year. Currently they operate three manufacturing plants, two in Yangmei and one in Hsinchu.

The company has been listed on the Taiwan Stock Exchange since March 1991, and has repeatedly been recognized for its remarkable growth. In 1993 it was awarded the National Quality Award of Taiwan and were ranked first place in J.D. Power Asia-Pacific's Sales Satisfaction Index in 2000 and 2001. They have also been awarded numerous accolades for exemplary working conditions in their manufacturing plants. As of 2019, Yulon Motor Group is the largest shareholder at over 40% and China Motor is consider part of the Yulon Motor Group.

Since 1995, CMC has invested heavily in China's South East Motor Corporation, and have poised themselves to take advantage of China's economic growth.

In 2005, the company was given approval from the Chinese government, and signed an agreement with DaimlerChrysler to produce minivans for the mainland market.

13.97 percent of the company is owned by Mitsubishi. All of CMC's models are of Mitsubishi origins, adjusted to appeal for the Taiwanese market.

Since June 2007, CMC is participated in the Fujian Daimler joint venture.

Products

Current

CMC brand vehicles
 CMC Veryca (中華菱利, 2000–present)
 CMC Zinger (中華雙贏, 2005–present)
 CMC P350 Hybrid (中華堅兵, 2022–present)

Mitsubishi brand vehicles
 Mitsubishi Colt Plus (2007–present)
 Mitsubishi Delica (中華得利卡, 1973–present)
 Mitsubishi Eclipse Cross (2018–present) (Import)
 Mitsubishi Lancer (1988–present)
 Mitsubishi Outlander (2001–present)

Former production
CMC Minicab (1978-1985)
CMC Towny (中華多利, (1985-1992)
CMC Varica (1985-2000)
Mitsubishi Freeca (1998–2008)
Mitsubishi Galant (1997–2004)
Mitsubishi Grunder (2004–2012)
Mitsubishi Savrin (2001–2014)
Soueast Lioncel (2000-2007)
Soueast Delica (1994-2013)
Soueast Sovereign (2003-2011)
Chrysler Town & Country (2005-2007)
CMC Leadca (中華新達, 2013–2018)

See also
 List of companies of Taiwan
 List of Taiwanese automakers

References

External links

Mitsubishi Motors Taiwan

Car manufacturers of Taiwan
Truck manufacturers of Taiwan
Vehicle manufacturing companies established in 1969
1969 establishments in Taiwan
Companies listed on the Taiwan Stock Exchange
Taiwanese brands